The 1935–36 NHL season was the 19th season of the National Hockey League (NHL). The St. Louis Eagles dropped out of the league, leaving eight teams. The Detroit Red Wings were the Stanley Cup winners as they beat the Toronto Maple Leafs three games to one in the Stanley Cup Finals.

League business
Prior to the season, the St. Louis Eagles franchise owners asked the league for permission to suspend operations for a year and then relocate back to Ottawa, however the league denied the requests. On October 15, 1935, the NHL bought back the franchise and players contracts for $40,000 and suspended operations. Chicago would not participate in the dispersal draft, while St. Louis would not have another NHL team until 1967.

During the season, the New York Americans were reported in financial trouble and were up for sale. Leo Dandurand, who had sold his interest in the Montreal Canadiens, was interested as was Joseph Cattarinich. Cattarinich said he would buy the team if the price was right. Later it was announced there would be no deal.

Regular season
Howie Morenz played badly for Chicago and incurred the wrath of Chicago owner Frederic McLaughlin. He was subsequently traded to the New York Rangers.

This was the year of Detroit. They finished first in the American Division. The Montreal Maroons finished first in the Canadian Division, but fans were starting to stay away from games they played, which worried now team president, manager and coach Tommy Gorman. At one point, Lionel Conacher had to run the team when Gorman experienced health and nervous problems.
At .500 at mid-season, they traded Toe Blake for Lorne Chabot, owned by the Canadiens after being suspended by Chicago and refusing demotion to the minors, and the team began to win with Chabot in the net.

Final standings

Playoffs

Playoff bracket

Quarterfinals
This was the final year that the league used a two-game total-goals series.

(C2) Toronto Maple Leafs vs. (A2) Boston Bruins

(A3) Chicago Black Hawks vs. (C3) New York Americans

Semifinals

(A1) Detroit Red Wings vs. (C1) Montreal Maroons
The first game of the Maroons-Red Wings series set a record for the longest game in Stanley Cup playoff history, as well as the longest ice hockey game ever played. The game began at 8:30 p.m. at the Forum in Montreal, and ended at 2:25 a.m. The game was scoreless until the sixth overtime, when Mud Bruneteau scored on Maroon goaltender Lorne Chabot to win the game. Normie Smith shut out the Maroons in the next game, and the Red Wings then beat the Maroons to win the series.

(C2) Toronto Maple Leafs vs. (C3) New York Americans

Stanley Cup Finals

Awards
Eddie Shore won his second consecutive Hart trophy. Frank Boucher's run of seven Lady Byng trophy awards came to an end as Doc Romnes won the award. Tiny Thompson won the Vezina trophy for the third time in his career.

All-Star teams

Player statistics

Scoring leaders
Note: GP = Games played, G = Goals, A = Assists, PTS = Points, PIM = Penalties in minutes

Source: NHL.

Coaches

American Division
Boston Bruins: Frank Patrick
Chicago Black Hawks: Clem Loughlin
Detroit Red Wings: Jack Adams
New York Rangers: Lester Patrick

Canadian Division
Montreal Canadiens: Sylvio Mantha
Montreal Maroons: Tommy Gorman
New York Americans: Rosie Helmer
Toronto Maple Leafs: Dick Irvin

Debuts
The following is a list of players of note who played their first NHL game in 1935–36 (listed with their first team, asterisk(*) marks debut in playoffs):
Ray Getliffe, Boston Bruins
Woody Dumart, Boston Bruins
Mike Karakas, Chicago Black Hawks
Mud Bruneteau, Detroit Red Wings
Alex Shibicky, New York Rangers
Babe Pratt, New York Rangers
Neil Colville, New York Rangers
Phil Watson, New York Rangers
Reg Hamilton, Toronto Maple Leafs

Last games
The following is a list of players of note that played their last game in the NHL in 1935–36 (listed with their last team):
Joe Primeau, Toronto Maple Leafs

See also
1935-36 NHL transactions
List of Stanley Cup champions
Ice hockey at the 1936 Winter Olympics
1935 in sports
1936 in sports

References

Works cited

Further reading

External links
Hockey Database

 
1935–36 in Canadian ice hockey by league
1935–36 in American ice hockey by league